Kimberly Lacy (born April 2, 1981) is an American television personality, painter, landscape designer and wardrobe stylist.  Born in Dumas, Arkansas, Kimberly currently resides in Atlanta, Georgia.

She is the project manager on HGTV's Curb Appeal: The Block, where she shares her practical painting tips, techniques and demonstrations with viewers. Prior to joining the show, Lacy served as the lead painter on the HGTV series Designed to Sell.

As celebrity stylist, Kimberly has worked with the likes of Wilhelmina and Elite Models, celebrity photographer Derek Blanks, and publications Essence & Black Elegance.  She owns and operates her own design and artisan paint company Anatomy of Design. Kimberly contributes monthly articles for Sister 2 Sister magazine's Home Improvement section.

Kimberly is an ambassador for a non-profit organization, The Fuller Center for Housing,  The organization increases the quality of living in impoverished neighborhoods. Most recently, Kimberly has been appointed to the 3M Construction & Home Improvement Division's Influencer Team and spokesperson for EarthShare California.

References

External links 

Official Kimberly Lacy website
Fuller Center for Housing

Living people
American television personalities
American women television personalities
People from Desha County, Arkansas
1981 births